Diplograptus was a Cambrian genus of graptolites.

References

Graptolite genera
Cambrian invertebrates
Paleozoic life of Ontario
Paleozoic life of New Brunswick
Paleozoic life of Newfoundland and Labrador
Paleozoic life of the Northwest Territories
Paleozoic life of Nunavut
Paleozoic life of Quebec
Paleozoic life of Yukon